Rybnik is a city in Silesian Voivodeship (south Poland).

Rybnik may also refer to:

Rybnik, Sieradz County in Łódź Voivodeship (central Poland)
Rybnik, Pomeranian Voivodeship (north Poland)
 Rybnik, Slovakia (Nitra Region) is a small village north of Levice

See also
Rybník (disambiguation)